Below are the ice hockey national team rosters of the 1984 Canada Cup.

Rosters

Canada
Forwards and defence:  Glenn Anderson, Brian Bellows, Mike Bossy, Bob Bourne, Raymond Bourque, Paul Coffey, Mike Gartner, Michel Goulet, Randy Gregg, Wayne Gretzky, Charlie Huddy, Kevin Lowe, Mark Messier, Rick Middleton, Larry Robinson, Peter Stastny, Brent Sutter, John Tonelli, Doug Wilson and Steve Yzerman. Training camp only -- Mario Marois, James Patrick, Denis Savard, Al Secord, Scott Stevens, Brian Sutter, Sylvain Turgeon and Rick Vaive 
Goaltenders: Grant Fuhr, Réjean Lemelin and Pete Peeters. 
Coaches: Glen Sather, John Muckler, Ted Green, Tom Watt

Czechoslovakia
Forwards and defence: Petr Rosol, Igor Liba, Petr Klíma, Jiří Dudáček, Vladimír Růžička, Vladimír Caldr, Jiří Lála, Dušan Pašek, Ladislav Svozil, Vladimír Kameš, Jiří Hrdina, Jaroslav Korbela, Vincent Lukáč, Miloslav Hořava, František Musil, Eduard Uvíra, Arnold Kadlec, Jaroslav Benák, Antonín Stavjaňa
Goaltenders: Dominik Hašek, Jaromír Šindel
Coaches: Luděk Bukač, Stanislav Neveselý

Sweden
Forwards and defence: Håkan Loob, Kent Nilsson, Bengt-Åke Gustafsson, Patrik Sundström, Peter Sundström, Thomas Steen, Anders Håkansson, Thomas Gradin, Per-Erik Eklund, Mats Näslund, Tomas Sandström, Jan Claesson, Mats Thelin, Anders Eldebrink, Jan Lindholm, Michael Thelvén, Bo Ericson, Peter Andersson, Thomas Eriksson
Goaltenders: Rolf Ridderwall, Peter Lindmark, Göte Wälitalo
Coaches: Leif Boork, Curt Lindström

United States
Forwards and defence: Bob Brooke, Aaron Broten, Neal Broten, Bobby Carpenter,  Chris Chelios, Dave Christian, Bryan Erickson, Mark Fusco, Tom Hirsch, Phil Housley, David A. Jensen,  Mark Johnson, Rod Langway, Brian Lawton, Brian Mullen, Joe Mullen, Ed Olczyk, Mike Ramsey, Gordie Roberts and Bryan Trottier. Training camp only -- Scott Bjugstad, Mike Eaves, Tom Fergus, Don Jackson, David H. Jensen (injured), Pat LaFontaine (injured/did not play), Craig Ludwig, Moe Mantha, Jr. and  Chris Nilan. 
Goaltenders: Tom Barrasso, Glenn "Chico" Resch. Training camp only -- Marc Behrend, John Vanbiesbrouck
Coaches: Bob Johnson

USSR
Forwards and defence: Vladimir Krutov, Igor Larionov, Sergei Svetlov, Irek Gimayev, Mikhail Varnakov, Sergei Shepelev, Sergei Makarov, Sergei Yashin, Aleksandr Skvortsov, Mikhail Vasiliev, Aleksandr Kozhevnikov, Anatoli Semenov, Vladimir Kovin, Vladimir Zubkov, Igor Stelnov, Vasili Pervukhin, Alexei Kasatonov, Alexei Gusarov, Sergei Starikov, Zinetula Bilyaletdinov
Goaltenders: Vladimir Myshkin, Alexandr Tyznykh
Coaches: Viktor Tikhonov, Vladimir Yurzinov

West Germany
Forwards and defence: Peter Schiller, Ernst Höfner, Franz Reindl, Manfred Wolf, Peter Obresa, Marcus Kuhl, Holger Meitinger, Gerd Truntschka, Roy Roedger, Dieter Hegen, Helmut Steiger, Michael Betz, Andreas Niederberger, Udo Kiessling, Rainer Blum, Joachim Reil, Peter Scharf, Dieter Medicus, Ignaz Berndaner, Uli Hiemer
Goaltenders: Karl Friesen, Bernard Engelbrecht
Coaches: Xaver Unsinn

References
"Coupe Canada 1984 Canada Cup" Official Match Program, Controlled Media Corp.,1984

Canada Cup rosters
1984 in ice hockey